Heads or Tales is the fifth studio album by the Canadian progressive rock band Saga and was originally released in 1983. The album was the second of the band's to be produced by Rupert Hine.  Although it did not attain the same commercial success and status of the previous collaboration between the band and Hine, Worlds Apart (1981), both "The Flyer" and "Cat Walk" became respectable radio hits for the band with the album eventually securing gold status in Canada (50,000) and Germany (250,000). A third single from the album, "Scratching the Surface", became a live staple and fan favourite in the band's concert line-up during the late-1990s and 2000s as a piano solo played by Jim Gilmour during a break by the other band members. The song reached #45 in the Canadian Singles charts, April 1984.

Track listing

Personnel
Saga:
 Michael Sadlerlead vocals (all but track #8), keyboards
 Ian Crichtonguitar
 Jim Gilmourlead keyboards, backing and lead (8) vocals, sax
 Jim Crichtonbass guitar, keyboards
 Steve Negusdrums, percussion, electronic percussion

Production:
 Judith Salavetz, Spencer Drateart direction, design
 Stephen Durkefront and back illustrations artwork 
 Andrew Scarthassistant engineer
 Stephen W Taylerrecording and mixing engineer
 Larry Williamsinner sleeve photography 
 ProducerRupert Hine

Charts

Weekly charts

Year-end charts

Certifications and sales

References

External links
 

1983 albums
Saga (band) albums
Albums produced by Rupert Hine
Portrait Records albums